Todd Rohal is an American independent filmmaker.

Career
Rohal attended filmmaking classes at Ohio University in Athens, Ohio.

Between 1997 and 2001 he directed four short films: Single Spaced (1997), Slug 660 (1998), Knuckleface Jones (1999), and Hillbilly Robot (2001).  Single Spaced and Knuckleface Jones both feature actress Piper Perabo, a college friend of Rohal.

His feature films include 2006's The Guatemalan Handshake, 2011's The Catechism Cataclysm, and 2014's ABCs of Death 2. 

He won the Jury Special Award for Best Film for The Guatemalan Handshake at the Slamdance Film Festival in 2006. 

Rohal received the Special Jury Award for Unique Vision at the 2014 Sundance Film Festival for his short film Rat Pack Rat.

M.O.P.Z. was broadcast by Adult Swim on April 4, 2016.The Suplex Duplex Complex was awarded Best Midnight Short at the 2017 SXSW Film Festival.

Filmography (as director)
 The Suplex Duplex Complex (2017)
 M.O.P.Z. (2016)
 Uncle Kent 2 (2015)
 Rat Pack Rat (2014) ABCs of Death 2 (2014)
 Nature Calls (2012)
 The Catechism Cataclysm (2011)
 The Guatemalan Handshake (2006)
 Hillbilly Robot (2001)
 Knuckleface Jones (1999)
 Slug 660 (1998)
 Single Spaced (1997)

Filmography (as actor)
 Hallelujah! Gorilla Revival (2008)
 Hannah Takes the Stairs (2007)
 Mrs. Palfrey at the Claremont (2005)
 Fifth City (2003)
 Lethal Force (2001)
 Scalps'' (1983)

References

External links

The Guatemalan Handshake: Official Site
Paste Magazine: Emergent Filmmaker: Todd Rohal
Podcast Interview with Todd Rohal

American film directors
Living people
Year of birth missing (living people)